The women's 400 metres hurdles event at the 2014 African Championships in Athletics was held August 13–14 on Stade de Marrakech.

Medalists

Results

Heats
Qualification: First 3 of each heat (Q) and the next 2 fastest (q) qualified for the final.

Final

References

2014 African Championships in Athletics
400 metres hurdles at the African Championships in Athletics
2014 in women's athletics